Nicetas of Chonae was a 12th-century bishop of the city of Chonae in Phrygia.

References

12th-century Eastern Orthodox bishops
12th-century Byzantine bishops
Byzantine Anatolians
Year of birth unknown
Year of death missing